Ian Stirling may refer to:

 Ian Stirling (biologist), Canadian zoologist and marine biologist
 Ian Stirling (broadcaster) (1940–2005), British actor and television presenter

See also
 Iain Stirling (born 1988), Scottish comedian, writer and television presenter